is a 1958 Japanese drama film directed by Mikio Naruse. It was Naruse's first film in colour and in widescreen format.

Plot
Journalist Okawa interviews farming woman Yae for his article on the present situation of farmers under the new constitution and after the agrarian reform. Yae tells of her hard labour life, financial worries, and her low status as a daughter-in-law and widow, which equals to "nothing" as long as her son is not married. At the same time, her older brother Wasuke, married already for the third time, tries to find a wife for his eldest son Hatsuji. When Yae tells Okawa of her brother's search for a daughter-in-law, he suggests a young woman who won a prize in an agricultural contest. During their travels to meet the young woman and her mother, Yae and the married Okawa start an affair. Hatsuji's marriage prospect, Michiko, turns out to be the stepchild of Wasuke's first wife Toyo, who had been thrown out by Wasuke's and Yae's patriarchal father for not showing enough fervour in the field work. Wasuke, insisting that the couple celebrates a traditional, lavish marriage, tries to borrow money for the ceremony against Yae's advice, who argues that traditions are not of the same importance to younger people. One after another, Wasuke's sons demand their independence in choosing their individual paths in life. Reluctant at first, Wasuke eventually sells the remaining parts of his lands to support his sons, while Yae sees her chance of finding happiness vanish when Okawa is transferred to Tokyo.

Cast

 Chikage Awashima as Yae
 Isao Kimura as Okawa
 Ganjirō Nakamura as Wasuke
 Nijiko Kiyokawa as Tane
 Keiju Kobayashi as Hatsuji
 Hiroshi Tachikawa as Shinji
 Kunio Otsuka as Junzo
 Akemi Ueno as Minko
 Michiko Fujii as Toshie
 Takashi Itō as Shiro
 Masao Oda as Daijiro
 Natsuko Kahara as Yasue
 Kumi Mizuno as Hamako
 Chōko Iida as Hide
 Ken Kubo as Tadashi
 Haruko Sugimura as Toyo
 Yōko Tsukasa as Michiko
 Michiyo Aratama as Chie
 Bontaro Miake as Shirase
 Daisuke Katō as Inspector
 Teruko Nagaoka as Landlady
 Teruko Mita as Maid

Reception
Naruse biographer Catherine Russell saw in Summer Clouds an "extremely progressive" film for the time of its making, which "incorporates key elements of the woman's film", articulating its social critique through the main character Yae. Additionally, she pointed out Ganjiro Nakamura's performance as Wasuke as one of the film's "real strengths". Contrary to film historian Alexander Jacoby, who cited Summer Clouds as an example of the "structural elegance" of Naruse's work, Dan Sallitt called the film "too well organized around its subject", but, like Russell, emphasised Nakamura's vivid and energising performance.

Awards
 Mainichi Film Awards
 Best Screenplay Shinobu Hashimoto (for Summer Clouds, Stakeout and Night Drum)
 Best Actress Chikage Awashima (for Summer Clouds and Hotarubi)
 Best Supporting Actor Ganjirō Nakamura (for Summer Clouds and Enjō)
 Blue Ribbon Awards
 Best Screenplay Shinobu Hashimoto (for Summer Clouds and Stakeout)
 Best Supporting Actor Ganjirō Nakamura (for Summer Clouds and Enjō)

References

Bibliography

External links
 
 

1958 films
1958 drama films
Japanese drama films
Films based on Japanese novels
Films directed by Mikio Naruse
Films with screenplays by Shinobu Hashimoto
Toho films
1950s Japanese films